Ferndown is a town and civil parish in Dorset in southern England, immediately to the north of Bournemouth and Poole. The parish, which until 1972 was called Hampreston, includes the communities of Hampreston, Longham, Stapehill and Trickett's Cross. At the 2011 Census, the population of the parish was 26,559, making Ferndown the largest inland town in Dorset in terms of population, being larger than Dorchester.

The district has a relatively large elderly population: in 2006, 38.5% were aged 60 or above.

Transport
Ferndown lies adjacent to the A31 trunk road between Wimborne and Ringwood. To the east, the A31 connects to the M27 and M3 via the outskirts of Southampton to Winchester, and thence to Basingstoke and London or via the A34 to the M4 north of Newbury. To the west, the A31 links to the A35 to East Dorset and Devon.

The nearby port of Poole provides year-round services to Cherbourg in France and Santander in Spain. Condor Ferries catamarans run seasonal services to Guernsey, Jersey and St. Malo, Brittany.

Ryanair, EasyJet, and formerly Thomsonfly,  Bmibaby and Palmair operate from the airport and provide scheduled services to destinations in the UK and Europe.

Ferndown is served by 3 bus routes: the 13 to Wimborne and Bournemouth, the X6 to Ringwood, Verwood, Bearwood and Poole and the 38 to Ringwood, all operated by morebus

Industry
On the outskirts of the town lie the Ferndown and Uddens Industrial Estates, forming the largest industrial area in East Dorset containing a wide range of both small and large businesses.  Ferndown Industrial Estate, Uddens Trading Estate and East Dorset Trade Park cover an area of approximately 61.h hectares. Many household names and major employers are present there, such as Farrow & Ball. A diverse range of industries are also represented covering business services, manufacturing, retail and many more.

Sport and recreation
 
The King George's Field named in memoriam to King George V is very large area of open space including a children's playground with equipment for children with special needs, six tennis courts, four football pitches, cricket pitch, a bowling green, boules area, croquet practice lawn, a rugby pitch and a fully equipped skateboard park.

There are two golf clubs, Ferndown Forest Golf Club, which offers a single 18-hole course, and Ferndown Golf Club, which offers two courses: The Old Course also known as the Championship Course, and the nine-hole Aliss Course also known as the President's Course.

The Ferndown Leisure Centre, situated next to Ferndown Upper School, has two heated pools, a sports hall, a fully equipped Gymnasium, Squash Courts and a rifle range as well as a power house suite. The Leisure Centre facilities (as well as the surrounding field) are shared with the Upper School.

Ferndown Community Centre is one of the town's main attractions, home of the Barrington Theatre in the main shopping centre at Penny's Walk, which also includes a large Tesco supermarket and the local branch of the county library.

Also there are large areas of woodland and heathlands around Ferndown including Holt Heath and Slop Bog. This heathland originally covered the entire area and up until the early 1900s covered many areas that are now residential. Also on many of the heaths and in much of the woodland there are many burial mounds and small ponds. However, recently Ferndown Heath, visible from King George V playing field, has been subject to several heath fires.

Education
Schooling in Ferndown, as in much of Dorset, is based on a three-tier system of first, middle and upper schools. Ferndown Upper School is a co-educational comprehensive school for students aged between 13 and 19, with up to 320 pupils admitted each year from its feeder middle schools in Ferndown, West Moors and Verwood.

Ferndown Middle School (on the former Gorsemoor Middle School site) takes pupils at age 9 from Ferndown First School (on the old Ferndown Middle School site), Hampreston First School and Parley First School. The Ferndown school changes occurred in the late 1980s and early 1990s, when the original first school was demolished to make way for a small residential area named Old School Close, and former Dorset Council offices, now called Enterprise House and owned by logistics company Hoare Lea. The two middle schools combined and one became the new first school.

Twin town
 Segré in the Maine-et-Loire département of France.

See also
 List of King George V Playing Fields (Dorset)
 Ferndown Common
 St Leonard's Hospital, Ferndown
 Parley Common
 St Mary's Church, Ferndown

References

External links 

Ferndown Town Council

Civil parishes in Dorset
Towns in Dorset